The Cedar Rapids and Missouri River Railroad was a railroad chartered to run from Cedar Rapids, Iowa to Council Bluffs, Iowa on the Missouri River.  It was the first railroad to reach Council Bluffs, Iowa, the eastern terminus of the First transcontinental railroad.  The city of Ames, Iowa was created as a station stop on the line.  It was one of four railroads that were built as result of the Iowa Land Bill of 1856 that gave land grants for railroads.

The railroad was organized on January 16, 1860, and composed largely of stockholders in the Chicago, Iowa and Nebraska Railroad Company, already in operation from Clinton to Cedar Rapids.

Union Pacific Railroad baron Thomas Clark Durant was to manipulate CR&M stock to add to his fortune.  Durant controlled another of the Iowa land grant railroads, the Mississippi and Missouri Railroad (M&M) and ran up its stock by saying the transcontinental railroad would connect to it.  At the same time, he was buying the depressed CR&M stock.  Then Durant declared that CR&M would be the railroad of choice for the transcontinental connection. After buying back the newly depressed M&M stock, Durant and his cohorts made about $5 million.

The city of Ames was chartered in 1864 for the railroad and was named by CR&M President John Blair for Massachusetts Congressman Oakes Ames.

In July 1862, the Galena and Chicago Union Railroad leased the line in perpetuity.  The Galena line was in turn consolidated with the Chicago and North Western Railway on June 2, 1864, and the line to Council Bluffs was completed in January 1867.  The lease was formally turned into a sale in 1884.

References

Defunct Iowa railroads
Predecessors of the Chicago and North Western Transportation Company
Railway companies established in 1860
Railway companies disestablished in 1884
Rail lines receiving land grants
1860 establishments in Iowa